The  opened on October 16, 2005 in Dazaifu near Fukuoka—the first new national museum in Japan in over 100 years, and the first to elevate the focus on history over art.  The distinct modern impression created by the architectural facade is mirrored in the Museum's use of technological innovations which are put to good in making the museum's collections accessible to the public. For example, the museum's extremely high resolution video system, with the latest image processing and color management software, serves both in documenting the objects in the museum's collection and also in expanding access beyond the limits of a large, but finite exhibition space.

The striking wood and glass building in the hills, it hosts important collections of Japanese artifacts, particularly ceramics, related to the history of Kyūshū.

It hosts temporary exhibitions on the third floor, while the permanent collections are on the fourth floor. The collections cover the history of Kyūshū from prehistory to the Meiji era with particular emphasis on the rich history of cultural exchange between Kyūshū and neighboring China and Korea.

Unlike most museums in Japan, which contract out conservation work, the Kyushu National Museum has an extensive on-site suite of conservation labs and associated staff, serving as the major conservation center for all of western Japan.

The museum was designed by Kiyonori Kikutake.

History
The museum's special focus carries with it "a new perspective on Japanese cultural formation in the context of Asian history."

Timeline
The growth and development of today's museum has been an evolving process:

 1994 -- Agency for Cultural Affairs (ACA) creates "Committee to Investigate the Establishment of a New Type of Museum."
 1995 -- Dazaifu is named as site of new "Kyushu National Museum."  The site is next to the Dazaifu Tenman-gū.
 1997 -- "Basic Statement of Policy for the Kyushu National Museum" is completed.
 1998 -- "Basic Plan for the Kyushu National Museum" is completed.
 1999 -- "Basic Construction Design"　is completed.
 1999 -- "Regular Exhibition Plan" is completed.
 2000 -- "Design for Implementing Construction" is completed.
 2000 -- "Basic Exhibition Design" is completed.
 2001 -- "Construction Phase" is begun—1st part of a 3-year plan.
 2002 -- "Implementation of Exhibition Design" is completed.
 2003 -- "Construction Phase" is completed.
 2003 -- "Exhibition Phase" is begun -- (1st part of a 2-year plan).
 2004—Work on the building is completed.
 2005—Museum is officially opened as the "Kyushu National Museum" of the "Independent Administrative Institution National Museum" (IAI National Museum).
 2007—IAI National Museum is merged into Independent Administrative Institution National Institutes for Cultural Heritage (NICH), combining the four national museums with the former National Institutes for Cultural Preservation at Tokyo and Nara

Notes

See also
 List of Independent Administrative Institutions (Japan)
List of National Treasures of Japan (writings)
 List of National Treasures of Japan (crafts-swords)

References
 Masaoka, Kenichiro, Masahiro Kawakita, Masayuki Sugawara, Masaru Kanazawa, Kenji ohzeki, and Yuji Nojiri. (2006).  "Image Quality Management for the Super Hi-Vision System at the Kyushu National Museum" (abstract), IEICE (The Institute of Electronics, Information and Communication Engineers) Transactions on Fundamentals of Electronics, Communications and Computer Sciences. E89-A: 2938-2944.

External links

Brochure of the Kyushu National Museum

Museums in Fukuoka Prefecture
National museums of Japan
Art museums and galleries in Japan
History museums in Japan
Museums of Japanese art
Buildings and structures in Dazaifu, Fukuoka
Kyushu region
Museums established in 2005
2005 establishments in Japan